Lorenzo Timothy Hampton (born March 12, 1962) is an American former college and professional football player who was a running back in the National Football League (NFL) for five seasons during the 1980s.  Hampton played college football for the University of Florida, and thereafter, he played professionally for the Miami Dolphins of the NFL.

Early years 

Hampton was born in Lake Wales, Florida in 1962.  He attended Lake Wales High School, and he played high school football for the Lake Wales Highlanders.

College career 

Hampton accepted an athletic scholarship to attend the University of Florida in Gainesville, Florida, where he played for coach Charley Pell and coach Galen Hall's Florida Gators football teams from 1981 to 1984.  Hampton shared the Gators' backfield with fellow running backs John L. Williams and Neal Anderson from 1982 to 1984, and he was often used as a blocking back when Williams and Anderson were the ball carriers.  Memorably, he ran for 138 yards against the Florida State Seminoles in 1982.  In his four seasons as a Gator, he compiled 1,993 rushing and 655 receiving yards.

Professional career 

Hampton started in thirty-three of the seventy games in which he played, and finished his career with 500 carries for 1,949 rushing yards and twenty-two touchdowns, 123 receptions for 954 receiving yards and six touchdowns, and ninety-six kickoff returns for 2,025 yards.

Life after the NFL 

Hampton's charitable foundation, Lemon-Aid Makers, runs a series of South Florida summer football camps in for inner-city elementary and middle school boys ages 7 to 14.

As of 2010, Hampton had been married to his wife Marcia for nineteen years.  They have two children: a daughter, Loren, and a son, Lorenzo, Jr.

See also 

 Florida Gators football, 1980–89
 List of Florida Gators in the NFL Draft
 List of Miami Dolphins first-round draft picks
 List of Miami Dolphins players

References

Bibliography 

 Carlson, Norm, University of Florida Football Vault: The History of the Florida Gators, Whitman Publishing, LLC, Atlanta, Georgia (2007).  .
 Golenbock, Peter, Go Gators!  An Oral History of Florida's Pursuit of Gridiron Glory, Legends Publishing, LLC, St. Petersburg, Florida (2002).  .
 Hairston, Jack, Tales from the Gator Swamp: A Collection of the Greatest Gator Stories Ever Told, Sports Publishing, LLC, Champaign, Illinois (2002).  .
 McCarthy, Kevin M.,  Fightin' Gators: A History of University of Florida Football, Arcadia Publishing, Mount Pleasant, South Carolina (2000).  .
 Nash, Noel, ed., The Gainesville Sun Presents The Greatest Moments in Florida Gators Football, Sports Publishing, Inc., Champaign, Illinois (1998).  .

1962 births
Living people
People from Lake Wales, Florida
Sportspeople from Polk County, Florida
Players of American football from Florida
American football running backs
Florida Gators football players
Miami Dolphins players